Antoine Deidier (1670 – 1746) was a French physician.

He was born on 23 November 1670 as the son of a Montpellier surgeon.

He was educated in the town, obtaining his medical doctorate in 1691, before becoming Professor of Chemistry in the same institution from 1697 to 1732.

In 1720, he provided - at the King's request - medical assistance at a plague outbreak in Marseilles, and was afterwards awarded the title of "Conseiller-médecin du Roi" and made a Chevalier of the Order of St. Michael.

He was an elected Fellow of the Royal Society in 1723.

He was physician to the galleys in Marseilles from 1732 to his death.

Works

Notes

External links 
 Deidier and the 1720 plague outbreak

1670 births
1746 deaths
18th-century French physicians
Fellows of the Royal Society